The 1993 Canadian federal election was held on October 25, 1993, to elect members to the House of Commons of the 35th Parliament of Canada. Considered to be a major political realignment, it was one of the most eventful elections in Canada's history. Two new regionalist parties emerged and the election marked the worst defeat for a governing party at the federal level. In a landslide, the Liberal Party, led by Jean Chrétien, won a majority government.

The election was called on September 8, 1993, by the new Progressive Conservative Party (PC) leader, Prime Minister Kim Campbell, near the end of her party's five-year mandate. When she succeeded longtime Prime Minister Brian Mulroney and assumed office in June, the party was deeply unpopular due to the failure of the Meech Lake and Charlottetown Accords, the introduction of the Goods and Services Tax, and the early 1990s recession. The PCs were further weakened by the emergence of new parties that were competing for its core supporters. Campbell's initial efforts helped the party recover somewhat in pre-election polls before the writs were issued. However, this momentum did not last, and the Progressive Conservatives suffered the most lopsided defeat for a Canadian governing party at the federal level, which was also the worst ever suffered by a governing party in the Western democratic world, losing all but 2 of their 156 seats and more than half of their vote from 1988. The Progressive Conservatives also launched a controversial attack ad during the campaign.

The Western-based Reform Party won over many traditional PC voters, particularly social conservatives, the Christian right, and many alienated Western Canadians. The popularity of Preston Manning, and profound Western discontent with the PCs, led the Reform Party to replace the PCs as the major right-wing party in the Commons, although it won only one seat east of Manitoba. Though the Progressive Conservatives recovered slightly in the 1997 election, they lost seats in 2000 and would never be a major force in Canadian politics again. In 2003, the Progressive Conservative Party disappeared entirely when it merged with the larger Canadian Alliance (successor of the Reform Party) to create the new Conservative Party of Canada.

The sovereigntist Bloc Québécois won almost half of the popular vote in Quebec and became the Official Opposition. To date, this is the only time that a party committed to the political secession of a region of Canada has become the Official Opposition of Canada. The traditional third party, the New Democratic Party (NDP), collapsed to nine seats only one election after having what was then its best performance. It remains the NDP's worst result in a federal election since its formation and the only election where the party polled fewer than one million votes.

Background

The Liberal Party had dominated Canadian politics for much of the 20th century. The party had been in office for all but 22 years between 1896 and 1984, with the Conservatives/Progressive Conservatives only forming government six times during this period.

Mulroney era
In 1984, Brian Mulroney led the Progressive Conservatives to a majority government with the most seats in Canadian history, winning a majority of the seats in every province. The Liberals lost 95 seats in the worst defeat for a governing party at the federal level at the time. The PCs made a strong showing in Quebec, a province where they had held few seats for much of the century. Between 1896 and 1984, they had only managed to win the majority of seats in that province once, in their 1958 landslide—the only other time besides 1984 that a party won 200 seats in an election. After winning only one seat in Quebec (out of 75) in 1980, the Tories won 58 seats in 1984, leaving the Liberals with almost no seats outside of Montreal.

Mulroney's government was based on a coalition of socially conservative populists from the West, fiscal conservatives from Atlantic Canada and Ontario, and Quebec nationalists. This coalition helped him win reelection in 1988 (an election almost wholly focused on the proposed Canada–United States Free Trade Agreement) with a considerably smaller mandate. Over the next five years, the popularity of Mulroney and his party collapsed. The late 1980s recession badly harmed the Canadian economy, as unemployment increased dramatically and the federal budget deficit grew. Despite the government's pledges to reduce the federal deficit, it grew from $34.5 billion in 1984, when Mulroney took power, to more than $40 billion by the time Mulroney stepped down in 1993. The federal debt had also grown to $500 billion. Mulroney had brought in the highly unpopular Goods and Services Tax (GST) in 1991.

Quebec constitutional status
Mulroney had also promised to change the constitutional status quo in favour of increasing provincial autonomy; this was one of the most important reasons for his party's support in Quebec. He attempted to amend the constitution twice, but both reform proposals failed. The Meech Lake Accord collapsed in 1990 when the provincial legislatures of Newfoundland and Manitoba adjourned without bringing the issue to a vote; all 10 provincial legislatures had to ratify the accord for it to become law. The Charlottetown Accord was defeated by the Canadian people in an October 1992 referendum. In the case of the Charlottetown Accord, the majority of Canada's population voted against an agreement endorsed by every First Minister and most other political groups. This stinging rebuke against the "political class" in Canada was a preview of things to come, as the upcoming election would be held on October 25, 1993, a year less a day after the Charlottetown referendum.

Mulroney out, Campbell in
These factors combined to make Mulroney the least popular leader since opinion polling began in the 1940s. The Progressive Conservative Party's popularity reached a low of just over 15% in 1991. With polls showing him facing almost certain defeat in the next election,  Mulroney announced his retirement from politics in February 1993. While several senior Cabinet members had passed over contesting the leadership, Minister of Justice Kim Campbell quickly emerged as the leading candidate to replace Mulroney as party leader and prime minister. Despite a vigorous challenge from Environment Minister Jean Charest, Campbell emerged victorious in the June leadership election and became Canada's first female prime minister.

Campbell enjoyed a brief period of high popularity upon being sworn in, becoming the eponym of "Campbellmania," just as Pierre Trudeau had been the subject of late-1960s Trudeaumania. Campbell campaigned extensively during the summer, touring the nation and attending barbecues and other events.

Opposition parties
The other traditional parties were also not faring well. While John Turner and the Liberal leadership supported the Meech Lake Accord, there was significant internal disagreement, with Trudeau returning from retirement to speak out against it. After the Liberals' disappointing showing in the 1988 election, Turner stayed on for a couple of years before resigning. The party then selected veteran politician Jean Chrétien over Paul Martin as party leader after a divisive battle, but Chrétien was unpopular, especially in his native Quebec, after declaring his opposition to the Meech Lake Accord, being rocked by caucus defections. The federal Liberals were disorganized, near bankruptcy, and dropped in the polls from 50 to 32 per cent, so Chrétien appointed Jean Pelletier as chief of staff to reinvigorate his leadership and reorganize his office. As the ruling Tories suffered the most backlash from the unsuccessful constitutional amendments in 1990 and 1992, the Liberals rapidly picked up support and surged to a wide lead in opinion polling.

The New Democratic Party (NDP) had won a record 43 seats in 1988 under Ed Broadbent, who retired the next year. In the following few years, their support continued to grow, at one point leading in the opinion polls. This helped the NDP win a series of victories at the provincial level. In a surprise victory in 1990, Bob Rae led the party to office in Ontario–the first time the NDP had formed a provincial government east of Manitoba. That same year, the NDP won a by-election in Quebec to take its first-ever seat in that province. The next year, under Mike Harcourt, the New Democrats were elected in British Columbia. Within a few years, however, the NDP provincial ministries in both Ontario and British Columbia became deeply unpopular, and support for the federal NDP also began to fall. In a deviation from their traditional position as staunch federalists, the NDP chose to align itself with the Liberals and PCs on the "yes" side of the 1992 Charlottetown Accord. As well, new leader Audrey McLaughlin made efforts to expand party support into Quebec instead of focusing on Western alienation, having defeated Dave Barrett, who had campaigned for the opposite policies. These positions gained the NDP little headway in Quebec and hurt the party's standing as the traditional voice of Western protest.

New parties
The greatest difference from 1988 was the rise of two new parties that cut into the Progressive Conservatives' support and caused Mulroney's "grand coalition" to implode.

After the failure of the Meech Lake Accord, Lucien Bouchard led a group of Progressive Conservative and Liberal MPs to form the Bloc Québécois. This party quickly gained the support of Quebec sovereigntists and access to the networks of the provincial Parti Québécois. Gilles Duceppe won a 1990 by-election, and throughout the period leading up to the election, the Bloc polled as the most popular party in Quebec.

The Reform Party of Canada was a Western-based populist party led by Preston Manning, the son of former Alberta Premier Ernest Manning. Originally broadly focused on Western Canadian interests, it had quickly moved far to the right after its formation.  It originally campaigned under the slogan "the West wants in". Reform had nominated candidates in the 1988 election, but had failed to win any seats, and garnered only 2.5 percent of the popular vote.  Many Western voters had never forgiven the Liberals for the National Energy Program in the 1980s, and Mulroney's attempt to pacify Quebec caused them to rethink their support for the Tories. In early 1989, Deborah Grey won a by-election in an Edmonton-area riding to become the first Reform MP. This came as a considerable shock to the Tories, who had dominated Alberta's federal politics for a quarter-century, and as Grey had finished a distant fourth in the general election held a few months earlier. As Conservative support collapsed over the next four years, Reform party support increased. Reform also picked up support from many longtime NDP voters. The NDP (and its predecessor, the Co-operative Commonwealth Federation) had been the traditional Western protest party for most of the last 40 years, but since the 1990s, they had attempted to make inroads in Quebec and had joined the Progressive Conservatives and Liberals in supporting the Charlottetown Accord. Despite sharp ideological differences, Reform's populism struck a responsive chord in disaffected NDP supporters.

Campaign

Pre-campaign
An election had to be called in the fall of 1993, since Parliament's term would expire some time in September. By the end of the summer, Campbell's personal popularity was far ahead of that of Chrétien. Support for the Progressive Conservative Party had also increased after Campbell won the leadership, and they were only a few points behind the Liberals, while Reform had been reduced to single digits.

With this in mind, Campbell asked Governor General Ray Hnatyshyn to dissolve parliament on September 8, only a few weeks before Parliament was due to expire. The election date was set for October 25. Under the Canadian Charter of Rights and Freedoms, this was the last day that the election could legally be held with the then-current enumeration still valid. In accordance with Canadian constitutional practice, Hnatyshyn granted the dissolution, beginning the seven-week campaign.

At the ceremony at Rideau Hall, Campbell made the first of a series of remarks that would dog the Conservative campaign. When she was running for the party leadership, Campbell's frank honesty was seen as an important asset and a sharp contrast from Mulroney's highly polished style (Mulroney was criticized for waiting until the last year of his mandate before resigning, leaving office only  months before the Tories' five-year term ended, as well as for his international farewell tour devoid of any official business). However, during the campaign, Campbell repeatedly made statements that caused problems for the party. At the Rideau Hall event, she told reporters that it was unlikely that the deficit or unemployment would be much reduced before the "end of the century". Later in the campaign, a reporter claimed she stated "an election is no time to discuss serious issues." Campbell denied the report and declared her sentence was distorted; her actual quote meant that 47 days were not enough to discuss the overhaul in social policy that she thought Canada needed.

Liberal

The Liberals had long prepared for the campaign. They had amassed a substantial campaign war chest, almost as large as that of the Tories. On September 19, the Liberals released their entire platform, which the media quickly named the Red Book. This document gave a detailed account of exactly what a Liberal government would do in power. Several years of effort had gone into the creation of the document, which was unprecedented for a Canadian party. Several days later, the Progressive Conservatives released the hastily assembled A Taxpayer's Agenda, but the Liberals had captured the reputation of being the party with ideas. The Liberals were also consistently well organized and on message, in contrast to the PC campaign, which the Globe and Mail on September 25 stated was "shaping up to be the most incompetent campaign in modern political history."

Bloc Québécois

The Bloc Québécois benefited from a surge in support for Quebec nationalism after the failure of the Meech Lake Accord in 1990, which resulted in a number of Liberal and Progressive Conservative Members of Parliament (MPs) organizing the Bloc. The Bloc's leader, Lucien Bouchard, campaigned on promising that the Bloc would represent Quebec's interests at the federal level, with the party running candidates exclusively in Quebec while endorsing and supporting Quebec sovereignty (political independence from Canada).

Reform

The Reform Party developed an extensive grassroots network in much of western Canada and Ontario. Reform's support for populist policies, such as a democratically elected and regionally equal Senate and more plebiscites and referendums in the political process, was very popular in Western Canada. In addition, Reform's backing of smaller government, lower taxes, the North American Free Trade Agreement, and social conservative policies as well as its opposition to the Goods and Services Tax won over many conservatives in the West and Ontario.

Small-"c" conservatives in the West and Ontario who traditionally supported the Progressive Conservatives were drawn to Reform for several reasons. These conservative voters were disenchanted with the PCs for imposing the Goods and Services Tax and failing to reduce Canada's growing deficit and national debt. There was also the PC government's failure to deliver a democratically elected Senate as it had promised (while appointing unelected Senators in 1990, as it was obligated to do), its socially progressive policies, and its repeated failed attempts to officially bring Quebec into the Constitution, a focus that was seen as coming at the expense of attention to the concerns of other regions, especially the West.

Reform had little money and few resources, with its candidates and campaign staff flying economy class, staying in cheap hotels, and relying on pre-packaged lunches, all which helped endear them to money-conscious fiscal conservatives. The campaign was managed by seasoned political strategist Rick Anderson. Some Reformers had been annoyed that a moderate former Liberal and Ottawa insider had been made campaign manager, but he soon proved his political ability.

Reform found itself embroiled in controversy when Toronto-area candidate John Beck made a series of anti-immigrant remarks in an interview with Excalibur, the York University student paper. York students confronted Manning with the remarks, who immediately denounced them. Within an hour, Beck was forced to withdraw his candidacy.

New Democrat

The New Democratic Party suffered badly in the election. With the rising unpopularity of the Ontario NDP government of Bob Rae, many traditional NDP voters were disenchanted and moved to the Liberal Party. In Western Canada, a portion of the NDP vote was attracted to the right-wing Reform party as a protest vote, as that party's populism struck a chord despite the sharp ideological differences between the two parties (as the centre-left NDP and Reform were on completely opposite sides of the political spectrum), and some went to the Liberals as well. Nationally, frustration with the PC party was also so high that some traditional NDP voters moved to the Liberals as a strategic vote. Although McLaughlin was returned in her own seat (Yukon), elsewhere the NDP was only truly competitive in Saskatchewan - even there, they finished third place in the popular vote although it was still enough to tie the Liberals for a plurality of seats at five (one more than the Reform Party).

Progressive Conservative

The PC campaign was headed by chair John Tory and chief strategist Allan Gregg, both experienced Mulroney loyalists. It was the best-funded campaign, but it quickly ran into organizational problems. The party failed to get literature distributed to the local campaigns, forcing all the PC candidates to print their own material and thus preventing the party from putting forth a unified message. The Progressive Conservative campaign was focused on three issues: job creation, deficit reduction, and improving quality of life. However, the party had little credibility on the first two, as over their time in office both unemployment and the deficit had increased dramatically. The party was also reluctant to propose new fiscal or social programs, as in Quebec they had to appeal to nationalists who opposed federal government intervention, and in the West had to appeal to Reform supporters who opposed government intervention in general.

In addition, what remained of the initial euphoria over Campbell quickly wore off as the campaign progressed. Her style was initially seen as frank and honest, but as her numbers dropped she was seen as condescending and pretentious. The Tories also continued to be dogged by the long shadow of the unpopular Mulroney.

Leaders debates

Over the course of the campaign, Progressive Conservative support steadily bled away to the other parties. The leaders debates were held October 3 and 4, and were generally regarded as inconclusive, with no party gaining a boost from them. The most memorable moment involved Lucien Bouchard continuously questioning Campbell about the real deficit in the 1993 budget and Campbell dodging the question. The French debates were held on the first night. Manning, who did not speak French, read prepared opening and closing remarks, but did not participate in the debate itself.

Chrétien ad

By October, the Progressive Conservatives were considerably behind the Liberals in the polls, and it was obvious that they would not be reelected. The consensus was that the Liberals were on their way to at least a minority government, and would probably win a majority without dramatic measures. Despite this, Campbell was still far more personally popular than Chrétien. Polling found that a considerable number of potential Liberal voters held negative opinions about Chrétien.

Believing they had no other way to keep the Liberals from winning a majority, Gregg and Tory decided to launch a series of commercials attacking Chrétien. While the ad's creators claim they had meant for the line "I would be very embarrassed if he became Prime Minister of Canada" to refer to Chrétien's policies and ethics, the intercutting with images of his face and its facial deformity (caused by Bell's palsy) were interpreted by many as an attack on Chrétien's appearance. The ad quickly received widespread attention as the Liberal war room under Roméo LeBlanc immediately contacted media outlets. This generated a severe backlash from all sides of the spectrum, including some PC candidates, and Campbell ordered them off the air.

Chrétien turned the situation to his advantage, comparing his opponents to the children who teased him when he was a boy. "When I was a kid people were laughing at me. But I accepted that because God gave me other qualities and I'm grateful." Chrétien's approval ratings shot up, nullifying the only advantage the Progressive Conservatives still had over him. The Tories also pointed out that Chrétien himself had used his half-paralyzed face in the campaign, with Liberal signs in Quebec that translated as "Strange-looking face, but reflect on what's inside." Furthermore, most newspapers and magazines had used similar photos that highlighted Chrétien's facial deformity.

Aside from raising Chrétien's personal popularity, it is unclear what effect the ad had on the election. Prior to the controversy, the Campbell Tories were already beset by many problems; notably the recession, the unpopular GST, and their support bases moving to Reform and the Bloc. Nonetheless, the negative backlash over the television spot proved to be the final nail in the Tories' coffin.  Their support plummeted into the teens, all but assuring that the Liberals would win a majority government.

Issues
The most important issue of the 1993 election was the economy. The nation was mired in the early 1990s recession, and unemployment was especially high. The federal deficit was also extremely high, and both the Reform and Progressive Conservatives focused on cutting it as the path to economic health. Reform proposed deep cuts to federal programs in order to do this, while the Progressive Conservatives were less specific. The Liberals also promised cuts, focusing on the unpopular and expensive plan to buy new military helicopters to replace the aging Sea Kings. They also promised new programs such as a limited public works programme and a national child care program. The Reform Party called for a "Zero in Three" plan that would reduce the deficit to zero in three years. The Liberals had a far more modest plan to reduce the deficit to 3% of GDP by the end of their first term. All opposition parties pledged to repeal the Goods and Services Tax. Once elected, however, the Liberals reneged on this pledge to much outcry, stating the Conservatives had understated the size of the deficit. Instead the GST remained. In some provinces it was Harmonized with the Provincial sales tax, while in other provinces the GST and the Provincial Sales Tax remained separate.

The 1988 election had been almost wholly focused on the issue of the Free Trade Agreement with the United States, and similarly, the 1993 election was preceded by the agreement on the North American Free Trade Agreement (NAFTA). The Liberals opposed NAFTA and promised to try to renegotiate the FTA, but this was not a central campaign theme. The NDP did focus on opposition to NAFTA, but the Canadian people mostly felt that the free trade debate was over. When in office, the Liberals signed on to NAFTA with little opposition. Similarly, while constitutional issues had dominated the national debate for several years, two failed reform proposals led most to support giving the issue a rest. Chrétien promised not to reopen the constitution, and that under the Liberals any change would be incremental in nature. In Quebec the election was seen as a prelude to the next Quebec election and the referendum on secession that was sure to follow.

The Reform Party advanced proposals in a number of areas that challenged the status quo. It proposed extensive reform to Canada's parliamentary system, including more free votes, recall elections, and change to the Senate. The party also advocated a reduction in immigration levels and a retreat from official bilingualism.

Finances
The election was held under the Election Expenses Act of 1974. This forced parties to disclose most donations, but put few limits on who could donate and how much could be given. Individual donations up to $1,150 were given a tax credit, encouraging such pledges. The Conservatives had the largest budget, spending $10.4 million on their national campaign; the Liberals spent $9.9 million, while the NDP spent $7.4 million. The Bloc and Reform both spent less than $2 million on their national campaigns. Actual election spending is far larger than these numbers indicate: each candidate raised substantial amounts of money independently of the national campaign. In this era there were also large expenses, such as polling and fundraising costs, that did not need to be disclosed.

In the year of the election, two traditional parties, the Liberals and Conservatives, each received about 60% of their funding from corporations and the rest from individuals. For the NDP half of the funding came from individuals, and a third came from trade unions. The Reform Party relied almost wholly on individual donations, with only some 12% coming from corporations. The Bloc relied almost solely on individual donations, as its party charter barred donations from corporations. The NDP had by far the most donors, with over 65,000, but the average donation was only $80. By contrast the 45,000 Conservative donors gave more than $200 on average.

The NDP and Conservatives had more problems after the vote. The NDP found itself deeply in debt, but recouped some of it by selling their Ottawa headquarters to the new Ukrainian Embassy. The Conservatives, despite cutting back on spending late in the campaign, were some $7.5 million in debt by the end of the election, and it took years to clear this burden. The heavy debt load would hamper the party's ability to campaign in subsequent elections, and this would lead to its eventual merger with Reform's successor, the Canadian Alliance.

Minor parties
Fourteen registered political parties contested the election, a Canadian record. Jackson and Jackson, in their book Politics in Canada, argue that the proliferation of minor parties was an outgrowth of the single-issue political movements that had come to prominence in Canada in the 1980s. For instance, the environmentalist, anti-abortion, and anti-free trade movements all had closely associated parties. Each candidate required a $1000 deposit, an increase from $200 in the last election. If the candidate did not win 15% of the vote, which none of the minor parties did, these deposits would be forfeit. Parties that nominated 50 candidates qualified as official parties and, most importantly, received government subsidies for advertising. The smaller parties were not invited to the main leaders debate, something Mel Hurtig of the National Party complained vehemently about. The Green Party of Canada Chief Agent Greg Vezina  organized a debate between the leaders of seven of the minor parties on October 5, which was broadcast on CBC Newsworld and CPAC. The National Party did not attend.

Few of these parties were expected to win a seat. One exception was the National Party. Founded by Mel Hurtig, a prominent nationalist, it campaigned on a strongly economically nationalist, broadly centre-left platform focusing on opposition to the North American Free Trade Agreement (NAFTA). The party ran 171 candidates, and for a time polling indicated it could potentially have an impact. However, the party failed to make a significant impression and imploded due to internal party turmoil. Some time after the election it applied to Canada's Chief Election officer to de-register the party. Another prominent minor party was the Natural Law Party. Linked to Maharishi Mahesh Yogi, it advocated yogic flying as the solution to most of Canada's ills. It ran 231 candidates, more than some major parties. Its campaign was also accompanied by several million dollars of advertising, and it was successful in attracting media attention. Some accused its efforts of actually being government-subsidized marketing for yogic flying centres, which are non-profit, non-religious meditation centres. Other minor parties included the Green Party of Canada which ran 79 candidates, Libertarian Party of Canada, the Marxist–Leninist Party of Canada and the Christian Heritage Party, which was mainly dedicated to opposing abortion. The election saw three minor parties focused on radical reform to the monetary system: the Canada Party, the Abolitionist Party, and the Party for the Commonwealth of Canada, which was formed by supporters of U.S. fringe politician Lyndon LaRouche.

This election was also the last time that the Social Credit Party attempted to run candidates in an election. The party had been in headlong decline since losing its last Member of Parliament in 1980, and was now led by fundamentalist Christian preacher Ken Campbell.  Campbell briefly changed the party's name to the "Christian Freedom Party" in an attempt to appeal to social conservatives.  However, the party failed to nominate the minimum 50 candidates and was deregistered by Elections Canada.

The satirical Rhinoceros Party was likewise deregistered after they declined to contest the election, in protest of new electoral laws that required parties to run 50 candidates at a cost of $1,000 per riding. Unlike the Socreds, however, the Rhinos would eventually reform in 2006, once the 50 candidate requirement had been dropped, and began contesting federal elections again beginning with the 2008 election.

Several unrecognized parties also contested the election, including the Canadian Party for Renewal (which was closely aligned with the Communist Party of Canada (Marxist–Leninist)).

Candidates

National results

This election, like all previous Canadian elections, was conducted under a single-member plurality (or first past the post) system in which the country was carved into 295 electoral districts, or ridings, with each one electing one representative to the House of Commons. Those eligible to vote cast their ballot for a candidate in their electoral district and the candidate with the most votes in that district became that riding's Member of Parliament. The party that elects the most candidates forms the government by appointing its party leader as Prime Minister and its Members of Parliament to the Cabinet of Canada.

For a complete list of MPs elected in the 1993 election, see 35th Canadian parliament.

Vote and seat summaries

Results by province

Ten closest ridings

Results analysis

Progressive Conservatives
The election was a debacle for the Tories. Their popular vote plunged from 43% to 16%, losing more than half their vote from 1988. They lost all but two of the 156 seats they held when Parliament was dissolved—far surpassing the Liberals' 95-seat loss in 1984. It was the worst defeat, both in absolute terms and in terms of percentage of seats lost, for a governing party at the federal level in Canada, and among the worst ever suffered for a governing party in a Westminster system. It is also one of the few instances of a governing party in any country going from a strong majority to being almost wiped off the electoral map.

Mulroney's "grand coalition" completely fell apart. The Tories' support in the West, with few exceptions, transferred to Reform, while their party's support in Quebec was split between the Liberals and the Bloc, and their support in Atlantic Canada and Ontario largely migrated to the Liberals. The PCs did win over two million votes, almost as many as Reform and far ahead of the Bloc or NDP. However, this support was spread out across the country. Due to the first past the post system, which awards power solely on the basis of seats won, the Tories support was not concentrated in enough areas to translate into seats. The party was shut out of Ontario for the first time in its history. Mulroney's former riding, Charlevoix in eastern Quebec, fell to Bloc candidate Gérard Asselin in a landslide; the Tory candidate only received 6,800 votes and almost lost his deposit.

Campbell was defeated in her Vancouver riding by rookie Liberal Hedy Fry—only the third time in Canadian history that a sitting prime minister lost an election and was unseated at the same time (it previously happened to Arthur Meighen twice: in 1921 and 1926). All other Cabinet members also lost their seats except for Jean Charest, who won re-election in Sherbrooke, Quebec; moreover, many prominent ministers such as Michael Wilson, Don Mazankowski, Joe Clark, and John Crosbie did not seek re-election. The only other Progressive Conservative besides Charest to win a Commons seat was Elsie Wayne, the popular mayor of Saint John, New Brunswick. Gilles Bernier, who had served two terms as a Progressive Conservative from Beauce, Quebec, was also re-elected, but was forced to run as an independent after Campbell barred him from running under the PC banner due to fraud charges.

In addition, 147 PC candidates failed to win 15% of the vote, losing their deposits and failing to qualify for funding from Elections Canada. The party as a whole was left deeply in debt, and came up ten seats short of official party status in the Commons. Without official party status, the Progressive Conservatives lost access to funding and had a considerably reduced role in Parliament.

Liberals
The Liberals swept Newfoundland, Nova Scotia, and Prince Edward Island, with only Wayne's win in New Brunswick denying them a clean sweep of Atlantic Canada. They also won all but one seat in Ontario; only a 123-vote loss to Reform's Ed Harper in Simcoe Centre denied the Liberals the first clean sweep of Canada's most populous province by a single party. In both Ontario and Atlantic Canada, the Liberals gained support from many centre-right voters who were fed up with the Tories but found Reform too extreme for comfort. Ontario replaced Quebec (see below) as the main bastion of Liberal support for the next two decades; the party easily won a majority of the province's seats in the next four elections.

In the West, the Liberals dominated Manitoba, winning all but two seats. They also won seats in Saskatchewan for the first time since 1974 and in Alberta for the first time since 1968. In Saskatchewan, the Liberals won the popular vote for the first (and, as of 2021, only) time since 1949 and tied the NDP for a plurality of the seats. All of their Alberta seats were in the Edmonton area (Anne McLellan in Edmonton Northwest, John Loney in Edmonton North, and Judy Bethel in Edmonton East), which has historically been friendlier to the Liberals than the rest of Alberta. The Liberals also held onto Edmonton Southeast, the lone seat in Alberta they held when the writ was dropped, which they picked up in 1990 when David Kilgour crossed the floor from the Progressive Conservatives.

Despite being led by a Quebecker, the Liberals were unable to recover their dominant position in Quebec. This was in part due to the staunchly federalist Chrétien's opposition to the Meech Lake Accord, which was revealed when leadership rival Paul Martin pressed him on the issue back in 1990. Chrétien's reputation in his home province never recovered, especially when the Bloc Québécois rallied on the issue. As a result, the Liberals were unable to capitalize on the collapse of Tory support in the province. The Tories had swept to power in 1984 largely by flipping many long-time Liberal bastions in Quebec, and held onto most of them in 1988. However, with few exceptions, most of that support bled to the Bloc in 1993.  While the Liberals dominated the Montreal area (home to almost 75% of the province's anglophones) and the Outaouais (home to a large number of civil servants who work across the river in Ottawa), they only won two seats elsewhere. One of them belonged to Chrétien, who won in Saint-Maurice, a strongly nationalist riding that he had previously represented from 1963 to 1986 (he had represented Beauséjour, New Brunswick as Opposition Leader from 1990–93). The Liberals also did not do as well as hoped in British Columbia, winning almost no seats outside Vancouver.

Even with these disappointments, the Liberals won 177 seats — the third-best performance in party history, and their best performance since their record of 190 seats in 1949. This gave them an overwhelming majority in the Commons; no other party crossed the 60-seat mark.  The Liberals were also the only party to win seats in every province.

Bloc Québécois
The Bloc won 54 seats, capturing just under half the vote in Quebec and nearly sweeping the francophone ridings there. In many cases, they pushed Tory cabinet ministers from the province into third place. This was the best showing by a third party since the 1921 election, when the Progressive Party won 60 seats.  The Bloc's results were considered very impressive since the party had only been formed three years before, and because there were lingering questions about its viability.

On paper, the Bloc was in a rather precarious position. Most of the Tories' support in Quebec was built on flipping ridings that had voted Liberal for decades. However, francophone anger at Chrétien's staunch federalism caused PC support in Quebec to transfer virtually en masse to the Bloc. Most of those seats would remain in Bloc hands for two decades, until nearly all of them were lost to the NDP at an election in which the Bloc was cut down to only four seats.

Despite only running candidates in Quebec, the Bloc's strong showing in that province and the fragmentation of the national vote made them the second-largest party in the Commons and gave them Official Opposition status. As the Official Opposition, they enjoyed considerable privileges over other parties; for instance, Question Periods in the 35th Parliament were dominated by issues of national unity.

Reform
Reform had a major breakthrough, gaining a substantial portion of the Tories' previous support in the West. The party won all but four seats in Alberta and dominated British Columbia as well. Reform also finished second in the popular vote in Saskatchewan, where they won four seats, and picked up one seat in Manitoba.

While Reform was expected to win over PC support, it also won around a quarter of voters who had voted for the NDP in the previous election. They did this by raising the problem of Western alienation and rallying against the Charlottetown Accord, two issues that the NDP made unpopular stands on. In one stroke, Reform had replaced the Progressive Conservatives as the major right-wing party in Canada (despite being virtually nonexistent east of Manitoba) and supplanted the NDP as the voice of Western discontent.

Reform had built up a large base of support in rural central Ontario, which had been the backbone of past provincial Tory governments.  This area is very socially conservative—in some cases, almost as socially conservative as rural Western Canada. However, this support did not translate into actual seats; massive vote splitting with the PCs allowed the Liberals to sneak up the middle and take all but one seat in the area. Reform did manage to take Simcoe Centre—their only victory east of Manitoba, ever—but even this win came by a wafer-thin 123-vote margin over the Liberals. They were also shut out of Atlantic Canada and did not run candidates in Quebec. It is not likely they would have won any seats in Quebec in any case due to Manning's inability to speak fluent French, its uncompromising federalism, and opposition to official bilingualism. Nonetheless, the election was a tremendous success for a party that had only won 2.1 percent of the national vote in the previous election.

Reform's heavy concentration of Western support netted it 52 seats. However, the Bloc's concentration of support in Quebec was slightly larger, leaving Reform three seats short of making Manning Leader of the Opposition. Though the Bloc was the Official Opposition, the Liberals reckoned Reform as their main opposition on all other issues that were not specific to Quebec. Also, in 1995 when Bloc leader Lucien Bouchard's position as Opposition Leader granted him a meeting with visiting U.S. President Bill Clinton, Manning was also given a meeting with Clinton in order to defuse Bouchard's separatist leverage.

New Democrats
The NDP won the fewest votes of any major party, and only nine seats — three short of the requirement for official party status. This was a substantial drop from its record performance in 1988. Those members who were elected were in heavily divided ridings, mostly in the party's traditional Western heartland. On average, winning NDP MPs only got 35.1% of the vote. Ultimately, the NDP only retained 34.99% of the votes it received in the 1988 election, even less than the 38.58% of the vote that the Progressive Conservatives retained.

The New Democrats lost support in several directions. One factor was the unpopularity of NDP provincial governments led by Bob Rae in Ontario and Mike Harcourt in British Columbia, which reflected badly on their federal counterpart. In 1988, the peak of federal NDP support was a major asset to the success of provincial affiliates; however, by 1993, they were a considerable liability to the federal party because of recessions, social policies, and scandals. Not coincidentally, the federal NDP was decimated in both of those provinces; it lost all 10 of its Ontario MPs and all but two of its British Columbia MPs, more than half of the party's caucus in the Commons. Defeated Ontario MP Steven Langdon had called upon Rae to resign, having spent the 1993 election campaign disassociating himself from the provincial NDP's measures. The Ontario NDP would be heavily defeated in 1995 (in which it was reduced to third place), while the British Columbia NDP rebounded long enough to survive until it was almost wiped out in 2001.

A significant number of NDP voters also switched to Reform. Despite sharp differences in ideology, Reform's populism struck a chord with many NDP voters; twenty-four percent of those who voted NDP in 1988 switched to Reform. In 1989, while running for the federal NDP leadership, former British Columbia Premier Dave Barrett argued that the party should be concerned with Western alienation rather than focusing its attention on Quebec. However, Barrett was defeated at the convention by Audrey McLaughlin, and his platform was not adopted by the party. The NDP also supported the Charlottetown Accord, which Barrett called a mistake since it was unpopular in Western Canada. In contrast, Barrett raised the issue of Western alienation and strongly opposed the Accord.  Barrett's warning proved to be remarkably prescient, as the NDP was severely punished in its former Western stronghold.

The NDP had never been a force in Quebec, but they had been supported by those who would not vote for either the Liberals or Progressive Conservatives. While McLaughlin made efforts to make inroads in Quebec, this proved fruitless and likely contributed to Western discontent. These voters largely moved to the Bloc, with 14% of NDP voters supporting the Bloc in 1993. The NDP lost their only seat in the province, which it had gained in a 1990 by-election, as Phil Edmonston, a Quebec nationalist, opted not to see re-election because he disagreed with the party's support for the Charlottetown Accord.

Legacy

The 1993 election is considered a political realignment election with lasting effects on Canadian politics. Since Confederation in 1867, Canada had a two-party system with the Liberals and Conservatives alternating in government. Since the 1920s there had generally been one or more third parties in the House of Commons. None of these parties came close to winning power and of those parties, the CCF was the only one that achieved long-term success. The CCF became the NDP in 1961 by which time it had clearly established itself as the nation's third major party.  It eventually gained enough strength to wield the balance of power in the Liberal minority governments of the 1960s and 1970s. After the 1984 election the NDP had ten fewer seats than the Liberals, there was considerable talk that Canada was headed for a UK-style Labour-Tory division, with the Liberals following their UK counterparts into third-party status. However, the Liberals recovered enough ground in 1988 to firmly reestablish themselves as the main opposition party.

The 1993 election fundamentally changed the balance of power among the parties. Together Ontario and Quebec are guaranteed a majority of seats in the Commons under both Constitution Acts. Both provinces constitute nearly two-thirds of the Canadian population. Thus, it is nearly impossible to form even a minority government without considerable support in one or both provinces. The Liberals were the only party with a strong base in both provinces, making them the only party with a realistic chance to form government. The Liberals dominated Canadian politics for the next decade, retaining almost all of its Ontario ridings while making steady gains in Quebec. They would not be seriously challenged until 2004, with the sponsorship scandal and party infighting reduced them to a minority government with continued strong support from Ontario. The Liberals retained the majority of the province's ridings, despite being defeated in 2006, finally relinquishing their lead in 2008.

As no party other than the Liberals had a realistic chance of forming government after 1993, some commentators felt that Canada had moved to a dominant-party system. The opposition was divided between four parties. Many commentators thought it ironic that Her Majesty's Loyal Opposition consisted of a separatist party. Many considered the Reform Party the de facto opposition on issues that did not pertain to Quebec and national unity. Some political scientists felt that the new five-party parliament was an example of a multi-party system. The five parties were reduced to four when the PC Party and Canadian Alliance (successor to the Reform Party) merged in 2003. From 2004-2006, a Liberal minority government faced three opposition parties, the new Conservatives, NDP, and Bloc. In 2006, the Conservatives became the Government, the Liberals relegated to official opposition, while the NDP and Bloc retained a significant opposition presence.

The Progressive Conservatives never regained their former standing in Canadian politics. In December 1993, Kim Campbell resigned as Conservative leader and was replaced by Charest, the only surviving member of the previous Cabinet. Under Charest, they rebounded to 20 seats in 1997. Despite the brief comeback of former prime minister Joe Clark as leader in 1998, they were reduced to 12 seats mostly in the Atlantic provinces and Quebec, winning only two seats outside this region in the next two elections.

The Reform Party became the Official Opposition in the 1997 election. Although Reform was now the major right-wing party in Canada, it was seen as too extreme by most Ontarians and thus had little chance of dislodging the Liberals. It was also hampered in Quebec because Manning could not speak French. In 2000, the party evolved into the Canadian Alliance, but even then won only two seats outside its Western Canadian base (both in Ontario).

In 2003, the Canadian Alliance under Stephen Harper and the Progressive Conservatives under Peter MacKay merged, creating the Conservative Party of Canada. The new party, led by Harper, was able to reduce the Liberals to a minority government in 2004 by capitalizing on the sponsorship scandal. It then formed its first government, a minority, in early 2006 with Harper as prime minister, just over two years after the merger. Key to its victory was being able to make inroads into the eastern part of Canada. In the 2008 election, the Conservatives won a stronger minority government before winning a majority in 2011. However, they were defeated in 2015 by the Liberals.

The NDP recovered somewhat, regaining official party status in 1997. However, it would take another decade for the party to reach the same level of support it enjoyed in the 1980s. The NDP supported the Liberal minority government after the 2004 election but moved towards differentiating itself from the Liberals, including uniting with the other opposition parties to bring down the Liberals and force the 2006 election in which the NDP made substantial gains in the House of Commons.

The Bloc Québécois failed to propel the sovereigntist side to victory in the 1995 Quebec referendum and lost Official Opposition status in the 1997 election. It continued to lose seats in the 2000 election, however, it remained a significant presence in the House of Commons bolstered in recent years by the sponsorship scandal. The party nearly tied its 1993 vote total in 2004, but lost support to a resurgent Conservative Party in 2006. The Bloc's position continued to erode in 2008. The BQ won with 47 of Quebec's 75 seats but, saw its popular vote decline, although it remained an important force in federal politics for Quebec. 2011 saw massive change in the province, with the Bloc falling to just 4 seats in the Commons, losing official party status. They however, made a modest comeback in the 2015 election, managing to increase their seat count to 10, 2 seats short of regaining official party status. In the 2019 election, they more than tripled their seat count and became the third-largest party in the House, once again becoming a strong force in Canadian politics. They repeated kept all of their seats and did not lose their vote share in the following 2021 election.

See also
 
List of Canadian federal general elections
List of political parties in Canada

Articles on parties' candidates in this election:

 Independents
 Abolitionists
 Canada Party
 Commonwealth
 Greens
 Libertarians
 National Party
 Natural Law
 New Democrats
 Progressive Conservatives
 Reform Party

Notes

References

Further reading
 
 National Party of Canada (1993). How to solve Canada's economic mess without raising personal taxes or increasing the debt. Montréal : National Party of Canada
 

 
 
Federal election